Alcabón is a municipality located in the province of Toledo, Castile-La Mancha, Spain. According to the 2021 census (INE), the municipality had a population of 678 inhabitants.

Toponym
The term "Alcabón" is of Arabic origin, and could mean the "cove". It is thought that its origin is due to the presence of some farmhouses, hence its old name was "Alcabón Homes".

Location
The municipality is located in the Torrijos region and adjoins the populations of Santo Domingo-Caudilla, Carmena and Santa Olalla, all of which are in Toledo.

History
There is data which indicates Alcabón's existence since 1095. By cession of Alfonso VII of Castile in 1156, it passed into the hands of Count Nuño Petriz or Pérez de Lara who handed over the Alcabón castle to the archbishop of Toledo, Don Juan, in exchange for "La Rinconada de Perales".

In 1179 Queen Eleanor of England donated Alcabón to the St. Thomas Cantuariense chapel, located within the Santa Maria de Toledo cathedral, remaining so until its sale in 1482 to Gutierre de Cardenas, first Duke of Maqueda.

During the War of Spanish Independence it suffered violently under the hands of the French army. Thinking that the Spanish troops were in the town, they ordered its looting and destruction.

Administration

Demography

Monuments
Among the monuments in Alcabón are the Virgen de la Aurora Hermitage, a small shrine of great devotion in the county built in 1606, the St. Thomas Cantuariense and Rollo de Justicia churches, which have octagonal shaft columns and capitals decorated with balls and having a brick base, the Alcabón Mill Museum of Oil and Wine (16th century). There are details in this mill that suggest that its age could be traced back to the time of Arab domination (8th to 11th century). Possibly in its typology, the most complete and oldest of which have remained to present day.

Celebrations
8 September - Patron feasts in honor of the Virgin of la Aurora.
29 December - Saint Thomas Cantuariense

References

Municipalities in the Province of Toledo